Clem Conroy (23 November 1926 – 5 July 1989) was an Australian rules footballer who played with Melbourne in the Victorian Football League (VFL).

Notes

External links 

1926 births
Australian rules footballers from Victoria (Australia)
Melbourne Football Club players
1989 deaths